Open-ended may refer to:

 Open-ended (gameplay), dynamic situations or scenarios that allow the individual to determine the outcome
 Open-ended (poker), situation in poker where the player has four of five cards needed for a straight that can be completed at either end
 Open-ended contract, a contract with no definite time limit
 Open-ended investment company, a type of open-ended collective investment in the United Kingdom
 Open-ended question
 "Open Ended," song by Sebadoh from their 1996 album Harmacy
 Open-end fund, collective investment which can issue and redeem shares at any time

See also 
 Open end (disambiguation)
 Open problem, or open question
 Open-question argument, a philosophical argument put forward by British philosopher G. E. Moore